Tomorrow is the second studio album by rock band SR-71 featuring the Top 30 hit "Tomorrow". It was the first to feature John Allen on drums, since Dan Garvin left after Now You See Inside. "My World" would later be re-recorded by Bo Bice for his debut album The Real Thing, in which frontman Mitch Allan played guitar and bass. The song was re-recorded and re-made once again in 2007 and released as a single in January 2008 by frontman Mitch Allan as promotion for his first solo album Clawing My Way to the Middle. His solo version of the song was softer and more relaxed and was renamed "Makes Me High".

This is the last album featuring guitarist Mark Beauchemin, who left the band for personal reasons; and bassist Jeff Reid, for medical reasons. He was diagnosed with lung cancer, and died on June 11, 2004.

Track listing

Chart positions

Personnel
SR-71
Mitch Allan - vocals, rhythm guitar
Jeff Reid - bass, backing vocals
John Allen - drums, backing vocals
Mark Beauchemin - lead guitar, backing vocals
Producers: Neal Avron, Butch Walker, David Bendeth & Mitch Allan
Engineers: Butch Walker, Mitch Allan, Neal Avron
Mixing: Neal Avron
Mastering: Ted Jensen

References

2002 albums
SR-71 (band) albums
Albums produced by Butch Walker
Albums produced by Neal Avron